Torvalds is a Swedish/Finnish family name. It may refer to:

People
 Ole Torvalds (1916–1995), journalist and poet
 Nils Torvalds (b. 1945), son of Ole; broadcast journalist, writer and politician
 Linus Torvalds (b. 1969), son of Nils; software engineer and creator of the Linux kernel, who now works and lives in the U.S.

Other
 9793 Torvalds, asteroid named for Linus Torvalds
 Tanenbaum–Torvalds debate, debate between Andrew S. Tanenbaum and Linus Torvalds about Linux and kernel architecture in general

See also
Torvald (disambiguation)

Surnames
Swedish-language surnames